Daimon or Daemon (Ancient Greek: , "god", "godlike", "power", "fate") originally referred to a lesser deity or guiding spirit such as the daimons of ancient Greek religion and mythology and of later Hellenistic religion and philosophy. 
The word is derived from Proto-Indo-European daimon "provider, divider (of fortunes or destinies)," from the root *da- "to divide". Daimons were possibly seen as the souls of men of the golden age acting as tutelary deities, according to entry  at Liddell & Scott. See also daimonic: a religious, philosophical, literary and psychological concept.

Description

Daimons are lesser divinities or spirits, often personifications of abstract concepts, beings of the same nature as both mortals and deities, similar to ghosts, chthonic heroes, spirit guides, forces of nature, or the deities themselves (see Plato's Symposium). According to Hesiod's myth, "great and powerful figures were to be honoured after death as a daimon…" A daimon is not so much a type of quasi-divine being, according to Burkert, but rather a non-personified "peculiar mode" of their activity.

In Hesiod's Theogony, Phaëton becomes an incorporeal daimon or a divine spirit, but, for example, the ills released by Pandora are deadly deities, keres, not daimones. From Hesiod also, the people of the Golden Age were transformed into daimones by the will of Zeus, to serve mortals benevolently as their guardian spirits; "good beings who dispense riches…[nevertheless], they remain invisible, known only by their acts". The daimones of venerated heroes were localized by the construction of shrines, so as not to wander restlessly, and were believed to confer protection and good fortune on those offering their respects.

One tradition of Greek thought, which found agreement in the mind of Plato, was of a daimon which existed within a person from their birth, and that each individual was obtained by a singular daimon prior to their birth by way of lot.

In the Old Testament, evil spirits appear in the book of Judges and in Kings. In the Septuagint, made for the Greek-speaking Jews of Alexandria, the Greek ángelos ("messenger") translates the Hebrew word mal'ak, while  daimónion (pl. daimónia), which carries the meaning of a natural spirit that is less than divine (see supernatural), translates the Hebrew word shedim as well as the word se'irim in some verses and words for idols (foreign deities), and describes the being Asmodeus in the Book of Tobit. The use of daimōn in the New Testament's original Greek text caused the Greek word to be applied to the Judeo-Christian concept of an evil spirit by the early second century AD.

In mythology and philosophy 

Homer's use of the words theoí ("gods") and daímones suggests that, while distinct, they are similar in kind. Later writers developed the distinction between the two. Plato in Cratylus speculates that the word daimōn ("deity") is synonymous to daēmōn ("knowing or wise"),  however, it is more probably daiō ("to divide, to distribute destinies, to allot").

Socrates
In Plato's Symposium, the priestess Diotima teaches Socrates that love is not a deity, but rather a "great daemon" (202d). She goes on to explain that "everything daemonic is between divine and mortal" (202d–e), and she describes daemons as "interpreting and transporting human things to the gods and divine things to men; entreaties and sacrifices from below, and ordinances and requitals from above..." (202e). In Plato's Apology of Socrates, Socrates claimed to have a daimonion (literally, a "divine something") that frequently warned him—in the form of a "voice"—against mistakes but never told him what to do. The Platonic Socrates, however, never refers to the daimonion as a daimōn; it was always referred to as an impersonal "something" or "sign". By this term he seems to indicate the true nature of the human soul, his newfound self-consciousness. Paul Shorey sees the daimonion not as an inspiration but as "a kind of spiritual tact checking Socrates from any act opposed to his true moral and intellectual interests."

Regarding the charge brought against Socrates in 399, Plato surmised "Socrates does wrong because he does not believe in the gods in whom the city believes, but introduces other daemonic beings..." Burkert notes that "a special being watches over each individual, a daimon who has obtained the person at his birth by lot, is an idea which we find in Plato, undoubtedly from earlier tradition. The famous, paradoxical saying of Heraclitus is already directed against such a view: 'character is for man his daimon'".

Plato and Proclus
In the ancient Greek religion, daimon designates not a specific class of divine beings, but a peculiar mode of activity: it is an occult power that drives humans forward or acts against them. Since daimon is the veiled countenance of divine activity, every deity can act as daimon.

A special knowledge of daimones is claimed by Pythagoreans, whereas for Plato, daimon is a spiritual being who watches over each individual, and is tantamount to a higher self, or an angel. While Plato is called ‘divine’ by Neoplatonists, Aristotle is regarded as daimonios, meaning ‘an intermediary to deities' – therefore Aristotle stands to Plato as an angel to a deity.

For Proclus, daimones are the intermediary beings located between the celestial objects and the terrestrial inhabitants.

Categories

The Hellenistic Greeks divided daemons into good and evil categories: agathodaímōn ("noble spirit"), from agathós ("good, brave, noble, moral, lucky, useful"), and kakodaímōn ("malevolent spirit"), from kakós ("bad, evil"). They resemble the Arabic jinni (or genie), and in their humble efforts to help mediate the good and ill fortunes of human life, they resemble the Christian guardian angel and adversarial demon, respectively. Eudaimonia came to mean "well-being" or "happiness". The comparable Roman concept is the genius who accompanies and protects a person or presides over a place (see genius loci).

A distorted view of Homer's daemon results from an anachronistic reading in light of later characterizations by Plato and Xenocrates, his successor as head of the Academy, of the daemon as a potentially dangerous lesser spirit: Burkert states that in the Symposium, Plato has "laid the foundation" that would make it all but impossible to imagine the daimon in any other way with Eros, who is neither god nor mortal but a mediator in between, and his metaphysical doctrine of an incorporeal, pure actuality, energeia ... identical to its performance: ‘thinking of thinking’, noesis noeseos is the most blessed existence, the highest origin of everything. ‘This is the god. On such a principle heaven depends, and the cosmos.’ The highest, the best is one; but for the movement of the planets a plurality of unmoved movers must further be assumed.

In the monotheism of the mind, philosophical speculation has reached an end-point. That even this is a self-projection of a human, of the thinking philosopher, was not reflected on in ancient philosophy. In Plato there is an incipient tendency toward the apotheosis of nous. ... He needs a closeness and availability of the divine that is offered neither by the stars nor by metaphysical principles. Here a name emerged to fill the gap, a name which had always designated the incomprehensible yet present activity of a higher power, daimon. Daemons scarcely figure in Greek mythology or Greek art: they are felt, but their unseen presence can only be presumed, with the exception of the agathodaemon, honored first with a libation in ceremonial wine-drinking, especially at the sanctuary of Dionysus, and represented in iconography by the chthonic serpent.

Burkert suggests that, for Plato, theology rests on two Forms: the Good and the Simple; which "Xenocrates unequivocally called the unity god" in sharp contrast to the poet's gods of epic and tragedy. Although much like the deities, these figures were not always depicted without considerable moral ambiguity: On this account, the other traditional notion of the daemon as related to the souls of the dead is elided in favour of a spatial scenario which evidently also graduated in moral terms; though [Plato] says nothing of that here, it is a necessary inference from her account, just as Eros is midway between deficiency and plenitude. ... Indeed, Xenocrates ... explicitly understood daemones as ranged along a scale from good to bad. ... [Plutarch] speaks of ‘great and strong beings in the atmosphere, malevolent and morose, who rejoice in [unlucky days, religious festivals involving violence against the self, etc.], and after gaining them as their lot, they turn to nothing worse.’ ... The use of such malign daemones by human beings seems not to be even remotely imagined here: Xenocrates' intention was to provide an explanation for the sheer variety of polytheistic religious worship; but it is the potential for moral discrimination offered by the notion of daemones which later ... became one further means of conceptualizing what distinguishes dominated practice from civic religion, and furthering the transformation of that practice into intentional profanation ... Quite when the point was first made remains unanswerable. Much the same thought as [Plato's] is to be found in an explicitly Pythagorean context of probably late Hellenistic composition, the Pythagorean Commentaries, which evidently draws on older popular representations: ‘The whole air is full of souls. We call them daemones and heroes, and it is they who send dreams, signs and illnesses to men; and not only men, but also to sheep and other domestic animals. It is towards these daemones that we direct purifications and apotropaic rites, all kinds of divination, the art of reading chance utterances, and so on.’ ... This account differs from that of the early Academy in reaching back to the other, Archaic, view of daemones as souls, and thus anticipates the views of Plutarch and Apuleius in the Principate ... It clearly implies that daemones can cause illness to livestock: this traditional dominated view has now reached the intellectuals.

In the Hellenistic ruler cult that began with Alexander the Great, it was not the ruler, but his guiding daemon that was venerated. In the Archaic or early Classical period, the daimon had been democratized and internalized for each person, whom it served to guide, motivate, and inspire, as one possessed of such good spirits. Similarly, the first-century Roman imperial cult began by venerating the genius or numen of Augustus, a distinction that blurred in time.

See also
 
 Agathodaimon
 Anthelioi
 Kakodaimon
 Demon
 Eudaimon
 Eudaimonia
 Fravashi
 Fylgja
 Genius (mythology)
 Guardian angel
 Holy Guardian Angel
 Hyang
 Anito
 Jinn
 Kami
 Moral imperative
 Shoulder angel
 Unclean spirit
 Yaksha
 Koalemos

In fiction
 Dæmon (His Dark Materials)
 Daemon (novel)
 Daemon (Warhammer Age of Sigmar/Warhammer 40000)

Notes

External links

Maureen A. Tilley, "Exorcism in North Africa: Localizing the (Un)holy" explores the meanings of daimon among Christians in Roman Africa and exorcism practices that passed seamlessly into Christian ritual.
Ante-Nicene Fathers, vol V: Cyprian, "On the Vanity of Idols" e-text Daemons inhabiting the images of gods
Abstract Personifications (a list of daimones of Greek mythology)

 
Christianity and Hellenistic religion
Deities in classical mythology
Demigods in classical mythology
Hellenistic deities
Legendary creatures in classical mythology
Socrates
Concepts in ancient Greek philosophy of mind